Jonah Aoina (born 25 February 1996) in a Samoan rugby union player who plays for  in the National Provincial Championship (NPC). He has played for the Samoan national team. His playing position is prop.

Early life
Aoina is from Toamua, Samoa. He arrived in New Zealand in 2013 and attended Otago Boys' High School. In 2014 he scored 18 tries for the school's First XV, including five in one game.

Aoina has played club rugby for Kaikorai RFC.

Rugby career

Provincial rugby career

Aoina has continued playing for Otago since 2016, scoring tries in each of the 2017 and 2018 seasons and earning 27 appearances between 2016 and 2020.

International career
Aoina was called up to the Samoa national team in 2021. He made his international debut against the Māori All Blacks on 26 June 2021. Aoina played two tests against Tonga in July 2021 as part of the Oceania region 2023 Rugby World Cup qualifiers; Samoa would go on to win both matches and qualify for the 2023 Rugby World Cup.

Reference list

External links
itsrugby.co.uk profile

New Zealand rugby union players
Samoan rugby union players
Living people
Rugby union props
Otago rugby union players
Rugby union players from Dunedin
1996 births
Samoa international rugby union players